Arisaema consanguineum, the Himalayan cobra lily, is a species of flowering plant in the arum lily family Araceae. Native to the Himalayas and Indochina, it is a tuberous perennial. The flower is a deep maroon hooded spathe striped green and white. It appears in summer, and is followed by a cluster of brilliant red berries in autumn.

It is cultivated as an ornamental plant for a permanently damp, sunny or partially shaded, sheltered spot, such as a woodland setting.

It is reported to cause indigestion and skin irritation if handled.

Distribution
It occurs in China, Taiwan, India, Myanmar, Bhutan, Nepal and Thailand.

References

Flora of Bhutan
Flora of China
Flora of India (region)
Flora of Myanmar
Flora of Nepal
Flora of Thailand
consanguineum